Football Club Zviahel is a Ukrainian football team from Zviahel. On 16 November 2022, the Ukrainian parliament has approved returning of the city's historical name and the club's name became coincidental with the city's name.

In 2022 the club debuted at professional level becoming the first football club from Zviahel to do so.

History
Created in 1993 as Zviahel-93, until 2002 the club competed exclusively in regional competitions of Zhytomyr Oblast. The club managed to become a winner of the regional competitions in 1993 and the second best in 1994. In 1996 and 1997 it won cup competitions of Zhytomyr Oblast and participated in the Ukrainian Amateur Cup where it yielded to FC Enerhetyk Burshtyn. In 1997 the club temporarily competed under the name of Lider. In 2002 as Fortuna Novohrad-Volynskyi the club folded due to lack of financing.

On initiative of the local sports school staff and students, in March of 2016 the club was revived and received support from the city authorities. In 2019 and 2020 Zvyahel again managed to win regional league competitions and participated in national amateur cup competitions earning its first victories. For the first time in 2021 the club joined the national amateur league competitions which due to the war were interrupted.

Players

Current squad

League and cup history
{|class="wikitable"
|-bgcolor="#efefef"
! Season
! Div.
! Pos.
! Pl.
! W
! D
! L
! GS
! GA
! P
!Domestic Cup
!colspan=2|Europe
!Notes
|-
|align=center|2021–22
|align=center|4th Group 2
|align=center|6
|align=center|9
|align=center|4
|align=center|0
|align=center|5
|align=center|8
|align=center|15
|align=center|12
|align=center|
|align=center|
|align=center|
|align=center|
|-
|align=center|2022–23
|align=center|3rd
|align=center|
|align=center|
|align=center|
|align=center|
|align=center|
|align=center|
|align=center|
|align=center|
|align=center|
|align=center|
|align=center|
|align=center|
|}

See also
 FC Zvyahel-750 Novohrad-Volynskyi

References

Ukrainian Second League clubs
Zvyahel Novohrad-Volynskyi
Association football clubs established in 1993
1993 establishments in Ukraine
Sport in Zviahel